Guliston (formerly Qarapchi) is a village in Sughd Region, northern Tajikistan. It is part of the jamoat Bunjikat in Shahriston District.

References

Populated places in Sughd Region